Ala Mândâcanu (born 14 December 1954, Balatina) is a Moldovan politician and journalist. She served as member of the Parliament of Moldova, editor in chief of "Democraţia" (2001–2004), deputy Chairman of the Social Liberal Party, and dean of the Faculty of Journalism. She has been living in Montreal since 2008. Ala Mândâcanu is the head of the Moldovan community in Canada's Quebec.

References

External links 
 Ala Mândâcanu - album de familie
 Ala Mândâcanu infirmă informaţiile privind deschiderea bisericii cu slujbe în limba română în Quebec 
 Ala Mândâcanu infirmă informaţiile privind deschiderea bisericii cu slujbe în limba română în Quebec
 Comunitatea moldovenilor din Quebec (Canada) şi-a lansat cartea de vizită
 10 PENTRU TINE CU ALA MANDACANU
 Lectia de unire 

1954 births
Living people
People from Glodeni District
People from Montreal
Moldovan MPs 1994–1998
Moldovan MPs 1998–2001
Moldovan female MPs
Eastern Orthodox Christians from Canada
Moldovan emigrants to Canada
21st-century Moldovan women politicians
20th-century Moldovan women politicians